Ethylbenzodioxolylbutanamine (EBDB; Ethyl-J) is a lesser-known entactogen, stimulant, and psychedelic. It is the N-ethyl analogue of benzodioxylbutanamine (BDB; "J"), and also the α-ethyl analogue of methylenedioxyethylamphetamine (MDEA; "Eve").

EBDB was first synthesized by Alexander Shulgin. In his book PiHKAL, the minimum dosage consumed was 90 mg, and the duration is unknown. EBDB produced few to no effects at the dosage range tested in PiHKAL, but at higher doses of several hundred milligrams it produces euphoric effects similar to those of methylbenzodioxylbutanamine (MBDB; "Eden", "Methyl-J"), although milder and shorter lasting.

Very little data exists about the pharmacological properties, metabolism, and toxicity of EBDB.

See also
 Methylbenzodioxolylbutanamine (MBDB; Methyl-J)
 Ethylbenzodioxolylpentanamine (EBDP; Ethyl-K)
 Eutylone (βk-Ethyl-J)

References

Psychedelic phenethylamines
Designer drugs
Benzodioxoles
Serotonin-norepinephrine-dopamine releasing agents
Entactogens and empathogens